Adilabad is a city which serves as the headquarters of Adilabad district, in the Indian state of Telangana. Telugu is the native language of Adilabad. Adilabad is famous for its rich cultivation of cotton. Hence, Adilabad is also referred as "White Gold City". Adilabad is called as the "Gateway to South India".

History 

The earlier name of Adilabad was Edlabad during the rule of Qutub Shahis. Adilabad derives its name from the erstwhile ruler of Bijapur, Muhammad Yusuf Adil Shah. It wasn't a homogenous unit for a long period. Adilabad was ruled by many dynasties like the Kakatiyas, Mauryas, Satavahanas, Chalukyas, Qutub Shahis, Asaf Jahis and by Gond Rajas of earlier sub-districts Sirpur and Chanda. It was created in 1872 by the ruler and In 1905 it was declared to be an independent district with a prominent headquarters. Later, many regions were combined and set apart. In 2016, it was divided into four districts namely, Adilabad, Nirmal, Asifabad, Mancherial.

Languages 
Telugu is the most spoken language in Adilabad (65% as native language). Due to geographical proximity with Maharashtra, Marathi is also widely spoken and understood (10.5% as native language). Other languages spoken in Adilabad include Hindi, Urdu and Gondi.

Geography 
Adilabad has an average elevation of 264 metres. The district shares its boundaries with Nirmal and Karimnagar districts of Telangana to the south, Komaram Bheem district on the east, with Nanded on the west and Yavatmal and Chandrapur districts of Maharashtra to the north.

The Kuntala Waterfall, rivers like the Godavari, Painganga, etc flow through the district. Mavala lake, built during the Nizam period, is situated 6 km south side of Adilabad city. There is a park adjacent to the lake. Other waterfalls in Adilabad include Pochara waterfalls also and Gayatri waterfall, where different rope games are conducted in year-round. Saptha Gundala waterfalls, consisting of 7 small waterfalls, is accessible only by track due to its isolated forest location.

Demographics 
Males make up  of the population, with females making up . 12,993 of the population are under the age group of 0–6 years. The city has an average literacy rate of 43.45%. The urban agglomeration population of the city stands at 139,383. It includes the population figures of its constituent census town, Dasnapur as 22,216.

Politics 

Adilabad is one of the seventeen Lok Sabha constituencies in the Indian state of Telangana and consists of eight Legislative Assembly segments.

Transport 

National Highway 44 passes through Adilabad. Hyderabad is 310 km from Adilabad. Nagpur is 196 km away from Adilabad.

TSRTC operates buses from Adilabad to various destinations in the state.

Adilabad has a railway station on Mudkhed-Majri section of Nanded railway division of South Central Railway (SCR).

Landmarks 
 Kuntala Waterfall
 Pochera Falls
 Gayatri Waterfall
 Kanakai waterfall
 Mavala Harithavanam
 Khandala Waterfall

Notable people 

 Komaram Bheem
 Samala Sadasiva (Sahitya Akademi Awards)

See also 
 Adilabad district
 List of cities in Telangana by population
 Syro-Malabar Catholic Eparchy of Adilabad

References 

Cities in Telangana
Cities and towns in Adilabad district
Adilabad district
Municipalities of Telangana
Mandal headquarters in Adilabad district
District headquarters of Telangana